In mathematics, given a group G, a G-module is an abelian group M on which G acts compatibly with the abelian group structure on M. This widely applicable notion generalizes that of a representation of G. Group (co)homology provides an important set of tools for studying general G-modules.

The term G-module is also used for the more general notion of an R-module on which G acts linearly (i.e. as a group of R-module automorphisms).

Definition and basics
Let  be a group. A left -module consists of an abelian group  together with a left group action  such that
g·(a1 + a2) = g·a1 + g·a2
and 
(g2 x g1)·a = g2·(g1·a)
where g·a denotes ρ(g,a) and x denotes the binary operation inside the group G. A right G-module is defined similarly. Given a left G-module M, it can be turned into a right G-module by defining a·g = g−1·a.

A function f : M → N is called a morphism of G-modules (or a G-linear map, or a G-homomorphism) if f is both a group homomorphism and G-equivariant.

The collection of left (respectively right) G-modules and their morphisms form an abelian category G-Mod (resp. Mod-G). The category G-Mod (resp. Mod-G) can be identified with the category of left (resp. right) ZG-modules, i.e. with the modules over the group ring Z[G].

A submodule of a G-module M is a subgroup A ⊆ M that is stable under the action of G, i.e. g·a ∈ A for all g ∈ G and a ∈ A. Given a submodule A of M, the quotient module M/A is the quotient group with action g·(m + A) = g·m + A.

Examples
Given a group G, the abelian group Z is a G-module with the trivial action g·a = a.
Let M be the set of binary quadratic forms f(x, y) = ax2 + 2bxy + cy2 with a, b, c integers, and let G = SL(2, Z) (the 2×2 special linear group over Z). Define

where

and (x, y)g is matrix multiplication. Then M is a G-module studied by Gauss. Indeed, we have

 

If V is a representation of G over a field K, then V is a G-module (it is an abelian group under addition).

Topological groups
If G is a topological group and M is an abelian topological group, then a topological G-module is a G-module where the action map G×M → M is continuous (where the product topology is taken on G×M).

In other words, a topological G-module is an abelian topological group M together with a continuous map G×M → M satisfying the usual relations g(a + a′) = ga + ga′, (gg′)a = g(g′a), and 1a = a.

Notes

References
Chapter 6 of 

Group theory
Representation theory of groups